Eilean Mòr, literally meaning "large island" in Scottish Gaelic, is the name of several Scottish islands. In some areas, the term merely refers to the large island of a group, and may be used in place of the actual name:

Saltwater
 Eilean Mòr, Cairns of Coll, see Cairns of Coll
 Eilean Mòr, Crowlin Islands in the Crowlin Islands
 Eilean Mòr, Burnt Islands in the Burnt Islands, Firth of Clyde
 Eilean Mòr, Dunstaffnage Bay, see Dunstaffnage Bay
 Eilean Mòr, Loch Dunvegan
 Eilean Mòr, Enard Bay, see Enard Bay
 Eilean Mòr, Flannan Isles
 Eilean Mòr, Loch Fyne, see Loch Fyne
 Eilean Mòr, Gulf of Corryvreckan, see Gulf of Corryvreckan
 Eilean Mòr, Loch Greshornish, see Loch Greshornish
 Eilean Mòr, MacCormaig Isles
 Eilean Mòr, Sandaig Islands, see Sandaig Islands
 Eilean Mòr, Loch Sunart
 Eilean Mòr, Loch Sunart (inner), further inland than the above island, lying south of Ceol na Mara

Freshwater
 Eilean Mòr, Loch Finlaggan, a freshwater loch on Islay
 Eilean Mòr, Loch Gorm, the location of Loch Gorm Castle, Islay
 Eilean Mòr, Loch Langavat, Lewis
 Eilean Mòr, Loch Sionascaig, see Loch Sionascaig
 Rainish Eilean Mòr, Lewis

See also
Eilean Dubh Mòr in the Firth of Lorn
Eilean Ruairidh Mòr in Loch Maree

Scottish Island set index articles